Vandenbrandeite is a mineral named after a belgian geologist, Pierre Van den Brande, who discovered an ore deposit. It was named in 1932, and has been a valid mineral ever since then.

Properties 
Vandenbrandeite grows in microcrystals, up to half a millimeter. It may be rounded, lathlike. The crystals are flattened on {001}. It grows in parallel aggregates, in a lamellar, scaly shape. It is tabular, meaning its dimensions in one direction are weak. It is a pleochroic mineral. Depending on the axis the mineral is seen the color of it changes, which is an optical phenomenon. On the x axis it can be seen as a blue-green, and on the z axis is seen as a yellow-green mineral. It is highly stable in the presence of both water and hydrogen peroxide. Vandenbrandeite, due to being strongly radioactive, is usually closely associated with other radioactive minerals. Its radioactive properties is due to its composition. The mineral is made out of 59.27% uranium, which is the main component of the mineral. It has a GRapi (Gamma Ray American Petroleum Institute Units) of 4,352,567.33. It has a concentration of  229.75 measured in GRapi. Other chemical elements included in vandenbrandeite are oxygen (23.9%), copper (15.82%) and hydrogen (1%). Although it is radioactive, the mineral is not fluorescent. It is a secondary mineral.

References 

Uranium minerals
Copper minerals
Triclinic minerals
Minerals described in 1932